Ricardo de Tomasi International  is an airport serving the town of Mercedes in Soriano Department, Uruguay.

The Mercedes non-directional beacon (ident: ME) is located at the airport.

See also

 List of airports in Uruguay
 Transport in Uruguay

References

External links
 HERE Maps - Mercedes
 OpenStreetMap - Mercedes
 OurAirports - Mercedes
 Mercedes
 Skyvector Aeronautical Charts - Mercedes

Airports in Uruguay